Mount Carbon is an unincorporated community in Murphysboro  Township, Jackson County, Illinois, United States.

Notes

Unincorporated communities in Jackson County, Illinois
Unincorporated communities in Illinois